The 2009–10 International Hockey League season was the 19th and last season of the International Hockey League (Colonial Hockey League before 1997, United Hockey League before 2007), a North American minor professional league. Seven teams participated in the regular season and the Fort Wayne Komets won the league title.

Regular season

Turner Cup-Playoffs

External links
 Season 2009/10 on hockeydb.com

United Hockey League seasons
IHL
IHL